Artsakh, officially the Republic of Artsakh, also known as the Nagorno-Karabakh Republic, is a de facto breakaway state in the South Caucasus currently populated by Armenians, but de jure considered a part of Azerbaijan.

References

Azerbaijani music
Armenian music
Music of the Caucasus
Republic of Artsakh culture